Morten Lund (born 6 January 1945 in Bjugn) is a Norwegian farmer and politician for the Centre Party. He was mayor of Bjugn from 1988 to 1993. He was a member of the Parliament of Norway from 1993 to 2005, representing Sør-Trøndelag.

References

1945 births
Living people
People from Bjugn
Centre Party (Norway) politicians
Members of the Storting
Mayors of places in Sør-Trøndelag
21st-century Norwegian politicians
20th-century Norwegian politicians